The Gentleman is a 1994 Indian Hindi-language vigilante action film directed by Mahesh Bhatt and produced by Allu Aravind, starring Chiranjeevi, Juhi Chawla, Harish Kumar and Paresh Rawal. It is a remake of the Tamil film Gentleman (1993). Three of the songs were re-used without any change in tune or instrumentation, from A. R. Rahman's original compositions for the original Tamil version.

Plot 
Vijay (Chiranjeevi) owns a little agarbatthi making business. When he is not busy with this, he is a master thief who steals crores and crores of money in order to build and run a school where students can freely study to become doctors, lawyers, etc. The police, led by Paresh Rawal are always on his tail, but he is ever elusive. Finally, he is identified as the thief and then is confronted by Juhi Chawla character, who loves him. He tells her what his intentions are and how his brother Ajay Shrivaastav (Harish Kumar), because he couldn't pay the donations for medical school committed suicide along with his mother. Vijay is finally caught and convicted and when he is released from prison, his dream school opens. He marries Juhi Chawla, who has waited for him for a long time.

Cast 
Chiranjeevi as Vijay 
Juhi Chawla as Roshni
Paresh Rawal as Inspector
Laxmikant Berde as Vijay's Friend
Harish Kumar as Vijay's Brother
Heera Rajagopal
Roja as item number "Chika Pika"
Shrivallabh Vyas as Judge
Kulbhushan Kharbanda as Minister
Deepak Tijori as Sub Inspector
Virendra Saxena as Public Prosecutor
Ashish Vidyarthi as Vijay's Lawyer

Production 
The Gentleman was a remake of the Tamil film Gentleman (1993), and it till date remains the last Hindi movie of Chiranjeevi.

Soundtrack 
Anu Malik was credited as the composer, though except for one composition, every other track was sourced from Southern hits, predominantly A. R. Rahman's soundtrack for the film's original Tamil version.

The song "Jhoom Ke Dil Ne" (which is on the soundtrack but not picturised in the film) is the Hindi version of the Telugu song "Jummani Tummeda" from Mechanic Alludu, featuring music by Raj–Koti.

References

External links 
 

1994 films
1990s Hindi-language films
Indian action films
Indian vigilante films
Hindi remakes of Tamil films
Films directed by Mahesh Bhatt
Films scored by Anu Malik
Geetha Arts films
Robin Hood films
1994 action films
1990s vigilante films
Hindi-language action films